Country Classics is a compilation album by country pop singer Juice Newton. It was released by EMI America Records on December 3, 2002.  The album comprises four songs taken from her "breakthrough" album Juice (1981), four from her follow-up album Quiet Lies (1982), two each from her pre-Juice albums Take Heart  (1979) and Well Kept Secret (1978), and the title song from Come to Me.  Two songs featured in this compilation, "It's a Heartache" and "Let's Keep It That Way" had hitherto been released only as singles, the latter being Newton's first top 40 country hit.

The CD also includes the rare "country single mix" of "The Sweetest Thing (I've Ever Known)", which replaced the string arrangement with a steel guitar.  This is the only commercial CD to include this version.

Track listing

References

2002 compilation albums
Juice Newton albums